Sesquifulvalene or Pentaheptafulvalene is a hydrocarbon in the fulvalene class with chemical formula C12H10. It is composed of linked cyclopentadiene and cycloheptatriene rings.

Properties
In the ground state, which is a singlet state, the central double bond is polarized, with a partial positive charge on the carbon atom of heptagonal ring and a partial negative charge on the carbon atom of pentagonal ring. This shift makes each ring have closer to 4n+2 π electrons, in keeping with the Hückel's pattern of aromatic stability. However, in the lowest quintet state, the central double bond is polarized with a partial negative charge on the carbon atom of heptagonal ring and a partial positive charge on the carbon atom of pentagonal ring due to Baird's rule.

See also 
 Tropone
 Biphenyl

References

Fulvalenes